Chamaesphecia oxybeliformis is a moth of the family Sesiidae found in Romania, Bulgaria, Ukraine and Russia, from Asia Minor to Armenia, and from the Caucasus to northern Iran.

The larvae feed on Marrubium peregrinum and Marrubium vulgare.

References

Moths described in 1846
Sesiidae
Moths of Europe
Moths of Asia